James Alexander McFadden (April 15, 1920 – August 22, 2002) was a professional ice hockey forward. He was born in Belfast, United Kingdom and raised in Miami, Manitoba, in the Opawaka district. One of six players born in Ireland to play in the National Hockey League, McFadden played for the Detroit Red Wings and Chicago Black Hawks between 1947 and 1954, as well as several years in different minor leagues. He is the uncle of Bill Mikkelson, and the great uncle of Bill's son, Brendan.

Playing career
McFadden started his career with the Portland Buckaroos of the Pacific Coast Hockey League. He spent two years with the Buckaroos before joining the Montreal Sr. Canadiens in the Quebec Senior Hockey League in 1941–42. In 1942–43, McFadden joined the Canadian Army. He was posted to Winnipeg and played hockey with the Winnipeg Army. After three years in the army, McFadden rejoined the QSHL, but this time with the Ottawa Senators. McFadden contributed a significant number of points and in 1946–47 he was traded to the Buffalo Bisons of the American Hockey League.

After averaging over a point with the Bisons in the AHL, he was signed to the National Hockey League by the Detroit Red Wings during their playoff run in 1946–47. The Red Wings ended up being beaten by the Toronto Maple Leafs in five games, but McFadden's two points during the playoffs helped give him another chance on the roster for next season. McFadden ended up scoring 24 goals during his rookie season and this helped him win the Calder Memorial Trophy. He is the second-oldest player ever to have won the award, having done so at the age of 27. He remained in Detroit for three more seasons, where he won the Stanley Cup in 1949–50, and was selected for the 1950 NHL All-Star Game.

On August 20, 1951, McFadden was traded to the Chicago Black Hawks with teammates George Gee, Max McNab, Jimmy Peters, Clare Martin and Rags Raglan in exchange for $75,000 and future considerations. McFadden played in Chicago for three seasons. He played in 19 games during the 1953–54 season, before being sent down to the minors. He played another three seasons in the minors with the Calgary Stampeders before retiring.

Awards and achievements 
Calder Memorial Trophy winner (1948).
Played in NHL All-Star Game (1950).
Stanley Cup championship (1950).
Inducted into the Manitoba Sports Hall of Fame and Museum in 2004.
Honored Member of the Manitoba Hockey Hall of Fame.

Career statistics

Regular season and playoffs

References

External links

Picture of Jim McFadden's Name on the 1950 Stanley Cup Plaque

1920 births
2002 deaths
Buffalo Bisons (AHL) players
Calder Trophy winners
Calgary Stampeders (WHL) players
Canadian ice hockey centres
Canadian military personnel of World War II
Detroit Red Wings players
Ice hockey people from Manitoba
British emigrants to the United States
Ottawa Senators (QSHL) players
People from Carman, Manitoba
Portland Buckaroos players
Sportspeople from Belfast
Stanley Cup champions
American emigrants to Canada